Jane Doe is the name of a series of nine made-for-television mystery films released by the Hallmark Channel between 2005 and 2008, and later appearing regularly on the Hallmark Movie Channel. While on the Hallmark Channel, it was broadcast in rotation with the movie series McBride, Murder 101, and Mystery Woman, under the umbrella title Hallmark Channel Mystery Wheel. In the UK, these movies are aired on a rotation basis, in the afternoon drama slot on Channel 5.

Dean Hargrove created the series.  Lea Thompson stars as Cathy Davis, a soccer mom who is secretly Jane Doe, an agent for the federal "Central Security Agency". The films focus on her efforts to keep her lives separate while solving mysteries. Thompson also made her directorial debut with the sixth film in the series, called Jane Doe: The Harder they Fall and went on to also direct Jane Doe: Eye of the Beholder.

Main cast
 Lea Thompson as Cathy Davis/Jane Doe
 Joe Penny as Frank Darnell
 William R. Moses as Jack Davis
 Jessy Schram as Susan Davis
 Zack Shada as Nick Davis

Films

References

2000s mystery films
American mystery films
American film series
Films directed by Armand Mastroianni
Hallmark Channel Mystery Wheel
Hallmark Channel original programming
Hallmark Channel original films
Television film series
American drama television films
2000s English-language films
Films directed by Lea Thompson
2000s American films